Francis Xavier Garchitorena (January 8, 1938 - February 25, 2005) was a Filipino Sandiganbayan Presiding Judge from 1986 to 2002.

Francis studied in Ateneo de Naga University and graduated from the Law School of Ateneo de Manila University in 1962. He was one of the leading lawyers during his time. He was appointed Sandigan Bayan Justice. Minita V. Chico Nazario was appointed to fill his place.

In 2001, he quarreled with Associate Justice Anacleto Badoy, but engaged in dialogue. Eventually Badoy would go on leave after the tensions reached a climax. Garchitorena is the third cousin of the legendary attorney Sen. Jose W. Diokno, the father of human rights and the intellectual leader of the peaceful EDSA revolution and the Marcos opposition, similar to how Apolinario Mabini was the "brains of the Philippine Revolution" and Rizal was the brilliant leader of the Propaganda Movement.

Family
Garchitorena's biological father, Buenaventura de Erquiaga Palacios (1895-1959), was a Spanish honorary vice consul, from Ea, Biscay. Garchitorena's mother, Flor Chereau Garchitorena (1902-1981), came from Tigaon, Camarines Sur, and was of Spanish and French descent. Flor's brother was Don Mariano Garchitorena, governor of Camarines Sur, secretary of Agriculture and commerce, and Minister to Spain.

Garchitorena was the grandson by paternal line of Felipe Santiago de Erquiaga de Odiaga (1859-?) and María Jesús Palacios Goitia (1858-?), and by maternal line of Don Andrés Garchitorena who also had Indian blood, a revolutionary mason and member of Aguinaldo's Hong Kong Junta, and of Marguerite Chereau, who was French.

Illness and death
On January 17, 2005, Garchitorena was diagnosed with brain tumor. He died at Makati Medical Center in Makati at 8:45 PM on Friday February 25, 2005.

References

1938 births
2005 deaths
Bicolano people
20th-century Filipino judges
Filipino people of Basque descent
Filipino people of French descent
Filipino people of Indian descent
Filipino people of Irish descent
Filipino people of Spanish descent
Ateneo de Manila University alumni
Justices of the Sandiganbayan